Yaft may refer to:
 Yaft Rural District, in Ardabil Province, Iran
 Laft, in Hormozgan Province, Iran